Pieria is one of the regional units of Greece located in the southern part of the Region of Central Macedonia, within the historical province of Macedonia. Its capital is the town of Katerini.The name Pieria originates from the ancient Pieres tribe. In Pieria, there are many sites of archeological interest, such as Dion, Pydna, Leivithra and Platamonas. Pieria contains Mount Pierus, from which Hermes takes flight in order to visit Calypso, and is the home of Orpheus, the Muses, and contains the Pierian Spring. Mount Olympus, the highest mountain in Greece and throne of the ancient Greek gods, is located in the southern part of Pieria. Other ancient cities included Leibethra and Pimpleia.

Geography

The Pieria regional unit is bordered by Imathia to the north, Kozani to the west, and to the south and west by the region of Thessaly's regional unit Larissa. The Pierian Mountains lie to the west; the Thermaic Gulf lies to the east. It also has a valley by the GR-13. Most of the population live within the Olympian Riviera. The lowest point is the Thermiac Gulf and the highest point is Mount Olympus.

It combines extensive plains, high mountains and sandy beaches. The region's beauty gives it a great potential for further tourist development.

Climate
Its climate is mainly of Mediterranean type with hot summers and cool winters. Severe winter weather is common in the central and western parts of Pieria, especially in the Pierian Mountains and on Mount Olympus.

On June 8, 2007, a low pressure weather system from Southern and Central Europe resulted in heavy rainfall that ravaged the prefecture and caused great damage in fruit and vegetable production. The worst hit area was Korinos.

Administration

The regional unit Pieria is divided into 3 municipalities. These are (number as in the map in the infobox):
Pydna-Kolindros (3)
Katerini (1)
Dion-Olympos (2)

Prefecture

As a part of the 2011 Kallikratis government reform, the regional unit Pieria was created out of the former prefecture Pieria. The prefecture had the same territory as the present regional unit. At the same time, the municipalities were reorganized, according to the table below.

History

The region, known as Pieria or Pieris in Antiquity, took its name from the Pieres, a Thracian tribe that was expelled by the Macedonians in the 8th century BC from their original seats, and driven to the North beyond the Strymon river and Mount Pangaeus, where they formed a new settlement in Edonis. The name Pieria has been connected to Homeric  "fat",  "fertile land" in a metaphorical sense.

At some time before the archaic period Pieria was incorporated in the Kingdom of Macedon (808 BC, see below) when it became the second province of the ancient kingdom, following its fate through the rule of the Antipatrid dynasty (302 BC - 277 BC) and the Antigonid dynasty (306 BC - 168 BC). It became part of the Roman Republic after the Fourth Macedonian War, and remained part of the Roman Empire and its successor, the Byzantine Empire.

It was later invaded and became a part of the Ottoman Empire. During the Greek War of Independence in 1821, Pieria took up arms along with the rest of Greece, but their struggle failed and Pieria did not join the rest of Greece until the Balkan Wars in 1913. Until 1947, Pieria was part of the Thessaloniki Prefecture (at that time the largest Greek prefecture), as a province. Pieria saw an economic boom in agriculture and business. During the Greco-Turkish War, it saw an influx of refugees from Asia Minor, now a part of Turkey, and several places were named after their former homelands including Nea Trapezounta from Trebizond (now Trabzon) and Nea Efesos from Ephesus (now Efes). The village of Elafos in the municipal unit Elafina, formerly a community in the Imathia prefecture, was attached to Pieria in 1974.

Transport
A1/E75
GR-1
GR-13

Notable people
 Katerina Nikolaidou (born 1992), rower athlete, 4th place 2016 Olympic Games, silver medal in the lightweight single sculls at the 2013 World Rowing Championships
 Christos Tsolakis (1935-2012), philologist, author, professor emeritus of Aristotle University of Thessaloniki
 Eleni Chatziliadou (born 1993), karate athlete, Kumite +68 kg 2018 World Karate Championship 
 Theodoros Terzopoulos, theater director 
 Konstantinos Papachronis (1977-2008), actor 
 Patriarch Callinicus of Alexandria 
 Yannis K. Semertzidis, physicist 
 Giorgakis Olympios
 Christos Kakkalos
 Zorba The Greek

Sporting teams

Pierikos - Greek Third Division
Pierian Sodality

See also
Olympus Festival
List of settlements in the Pieria regional unit

References

External links

  Αρχειοθετημένο από το  στις 19 Ιουνίου 2004  
  
   

 
Prefectures of Greece
Locations in the Iliad
Regional units of Central Macedonia